The discography of the Japanese band Animetal consists of eight studio albums, three compilation albums, and ten singles released since 1996.

Albums

Studio albums

Karaoke albums

Live albums

Compilations

International releases

Singles

Videography

Live video albums

Animetal Lady

Albums

Studio albums

Karaoke albums

Singles

Animetal USA

Albums

Studio albums

Singles

Animetal the Second

Albums

Studio albums

Footnotes

References

External links 
 

Discographies of Japanese artists
Heavy metal discographies